Malinukha is a rural locality (a village) in Churovskoye Rural Settlement, Sheksninsky District, Vologda Oblast, Russia. The population was 132 as of 2002. There are 2 streets.

Geography 
Malinukha is located 18 km north of Sheksna (the district's administrative centre) by road. Rechnaya Sosnovka is the nearest rural locality.

References 

Rural localities in Sheksninsky District